Caloptilia argalea is a moth of the family Gracillariidae. It is known from India (Meghalaya) and Sri Lanka.

References

argalea
Moths of Asia
Moths described in 1908